St Michael's on Wyre is a village on the Fylde, in the Borough of Wyre, in Lancashire, England; it lies on the River Wyre. The village is centred on the church of St Michael's which was founded before 640 AD.  It is in the civil parish of Upper Rawcliffe with Tarnacre, which had a population in 2001 of 604. For later counts see the Civil parish.

History
In 1835 the parish of St Michael's contained the townships of Out Rawcliffe, Upper Rawcliffe, Elswick, Great Eccleston, Inskip-with-Sowerby, Newsham and Woodplumpton.

In 1984, 16 people were killed in the Abbeystead disaster, during a visit by a party from St Michael's to a waterworks  up the River Wyre.

Following severe flooding in 2015 which resulted in the evacuation of the villagers, Prince Harry visited the village to meet with residents affected and reopen the refurbished village hall.

In January 2023, a local woman Nicola Bulley went missing near the village. On 19 February, two walkers found her body in the river approximately one mile downstream of the village. This incident attracted widespread news interest and speculation before she was found.

Today
Despite its small size, the village has its own pub, car garage, school, village hall, tennis club, bowling club and nearby Myerscough College. The parish church of St Michael is the village's most prominent landmark. The nave and chancel date from the 14th century, and the tower from the 16th. It is one of only two Grade I listed buildings in the Borough of Wyre.

There is a post office within the village hall.

Location
St Michael's on Wyre is between Lancaster, Preston and Blackpool.

Transport
It has three grass runways, and its airport code is GB-0398. It is the home of Northern Microlight School, which was founded in 1982. Elizabeth II visited the airfield in May 2015.

See also

Listed buildings in Upper Rawcliffe-with-Tarnacre

References

External links

St Michael's Village Hall

Villages in Lancashire
Geography of the Borough of Wyre
The Fylde